Claver College was a Black Catholic university in Guthrie, Oklahoma, founded by Sr Joseph O'Conner in 1933 to serve the area's African Americans. It was supported with funding from Katharine Drexel (who had founded Xavier University of Louisiana, the nation's only Catholic HBCU, in 1925). The college was named after Peter Claver, a Jesuit missionary.

The college, a night school, operated out of a building that also hosted a grocery store. It ceased operations in 1944, and its former place of operation, the floodplain neighborhood of "Little Africa", was later destroyed. It has since experienced sustained restoration efforts. The school is scheduled to be included in an upcoming book from Dr. Katrina Sanders, “The Rise and Fall of Black Catholic Education in a Changing South, 1886-1976”.

References 

African-American Roman Catholic schools
African-American Catholic colleges and universities
Higher education in the United States
African-American history of Oklahoma
Guthrie, Oklahoma
Sisters of the Blessed Sacrament
Order of Saint Benedict
Catholic universities and colleges in Oklahoma

Schools founded by St. Katharine Drexel
Educational institutions established in 1933
Educational institutions disestablished in 1944